Antonius J Staal (born 30 March 1996) is a Dutch cricketer. He made his Twenty20 debut for the Netherlands in the 2018 MCC Tri-Nation Series against the Marylebone Cricket Club on 29 July 2018.

In July 2019, he was selected to play for the Amsterdam Knights in the inaugural edition of the Euro T20 Slam cricket tournament. Later the same month, he was named in the Dutch squad for the Twenty20 International (T20I) series against the United Arab Emirates. He made his T20I debut for the Netherlands against the United Arab Emirates on 3 August 2019.

In September 2019, he was named in the Dutch squad for the 2019 ICC T20 World Cup Qualifier tournament in the United Arab Emirates. In April 2020, he was one of seventeen Dutch-based cricketers to be named in the team's senior squad. He made his List A debut on 11 May 2021, for the Netherlands A team against the Ireland Wolves, during their tour of Ireland. Later the same month, he was named in the Dutch One Day International (ODI) squad for their series against Scotland.

In May 2022, he was named in the Dutch ODI squad for their series against the West Indies.

References

External links
 

1996 births
Living people
Dutch cricketers
Netherlands Twenty20 International cricketers
Place of birth missing (living people)